Vesna Dolonc and Irina Khromacheva were the defending champions, having won the event in 2012, but both players chose not to defend their title. Dolonc played instead at the 2013 Sparta Prague Open.

Julia Glushko and Paula Ormaechea won the title, defeating Stéphanie Dubois and Kurumi Nara in the final, 7–5, 7–6(13–11).

Seeds

Draw

References 
 Draw

Open Saint-Gaudens Midi-Pyrenees - Doubles